Partido Unión Republicana Progresista (Republican Progressive Union Party) was a political party in Puerto Rico that ran in the 1944 elections. Founded in 1940, it resulted from Partido Unión Republicana.  Its president was Celestino Iriarte. It ceased to exists in 1948 when it changed its name to Partido Estadista Puertorriqueño (Puerto Rican Statehood Party).

See also

Socialist Party (Puerto Rico)
Partido Republicano Puro
Partido Unión Republicana

References

Further reading 
 José Trías Monge, Puerto Rico: The Trials of the Oldest Colony in the World (Yale University Press, 1997)

External links
 Elecciones en Puerto Rico.
 Coaliciones, alianzas, y uniones entre las colectividades (1896-1945) by CECANGPR
 Entre 1920 y 1924 on Pomarrosas

Defunct political parties in Puerto Rico
Political parties established in 1944
1948 disestablishments
Statehood movement in Puerto Rico
Political parties in Puerto Rico